Kawashima Naniwa (Japanese: 川島浪速; Kawashima Naniwa; 1865-1949) was a Japanese spy who worked in Manchuria. He was a close friend of Shanqi, the 10th Prince Su, who had inherited the allegiance of the tribes of Inner Mongolia, and aided Shanqi and his Royalist Party in attempts to create an independent Manchu state. Prince Su was also a close friend of Prince Kan'in Kotohito, the uncle of the Japanese empress.

After Prince Su's death, his daughter Dongzhen (東珍; lit. "east jewel"), was adopted at the age of eight, by Kawashima. Kawashima raised her as his own daughter and re-educated her as a Japanese, adopting the name Yoshiko Kawashima. She later accused him of raping her at the age of 17, and went on to become a spy in China for the Japanese.

References

External links
 A site about Kawashima

Bibliography 

1865 births
1949 deaths
World War II spies for Japan